Museum of Ukrainian Diaspora (formerly known as Museum of Cultural Heritage) is one of the museums in Kyiv, Ukraine, dedicated to Ukrainian diaspora prominent representatives in different fields of human activities.

Currently it is a branch of the Kyiv History Museum.

It was created in May 1999. The museum is housed in an XVIIIth-century maison in the historical Kyiv area Pechersk.

Eight exposition rooms of the museum display the heritage, life, and activities of Ukrainians abroad.

On interest can be memorial rooms dedicated to the former Kyiv residents who became notable such as Serge Lifar (France), Igor Sikorsky, Vladimir Horowitz (both latter USA), and many others. So, an interesting museum collection depicts the artistic life of the Krychevsky family, whose representatives were scattered throughout the world, including France, the United States and even Venezuela. For your kind attention are several pictures and sketches of Vasyl Krychevsky, the founder of the dynasty, and watercolors of Mykola Krychevsky and Kateryna Krychevska-Rosandich, as well as several works of Vasyl Krychevsky Jr.

The museum has showrooms for regular, as well as the irregular memorial, artistic, documentary, and book exhibitions.

References

External links 
 Official webpage of Museum of Ukrainian Diaspora on Facebook
 Museum of Ukrainian Diaspora on Official website of the Museum of Kyiv history
 MUSEUM OF THE UKRAINIAN DIASPORA on bodnarchuk.com.ua

Sources 
 Museums of Kyiv. Guidebook, 2005. - P. 71

Museums in Kyiv
Pecherskyi District